Xeranthemum is a genus of flowering plants in the family Asteraceae, native to Southern Europe.

It has silvery flower heads with purplish tubular flowers.

Species
Species include:

 Xeranthemum annuum L. ("annual everlasting"): Central + southern Europe from Spain to Dagestan; Turkey, Caucasus
 Xeranthemum cylindraceum Sm.: Central + southern Europe from Portugal to Ukraine; Turkey, Caucasus, Iran, Iraq, Syria, Jordan, Israel
 Xeranthemum cylindricum Spreng. 
 Xeranthemum inapertum (L.) Mill.: southern Europe, North Africa, southwest Asia from Morocco to Turkmenistan
 Xeranthemum longepapposum Fisch. & C.A.Mey.: southeastern Europe, southwestern and central Asia
 Xeranthemum squarrosum Boiss.: Greece, southwestern and central Asia

References

 
Flora of Europe
Flora of North Africa
Taxa named by Carl Linnaeus
Asteraceae genera